The men's doubles tennis event at the 2017 Summer Universiade was held from August 22 to 28 at the Taipei Tennis Center in Taipei, Taiwan.

Aslan Karatsev and Richard Muzaev won the gold medal, defeating Jack Findel-Hawkins and Luke Johnson in the final, 6–1, 3–6, [10–7].

Shintaro Imai and Kaito Uesugi, and Wong Chun-hun and Yeung Pak-long won the bronze medals.

Seeds
The top two seeds receive a bye into the second round.

Draw

Finals

Top half

Bottom half

References
Main Draw

Men's doubles